The Estates, also known as the States, was the assembly of the representatives of the estates of the realm, the divisions of society in feudal times, called together for purposes of deliberation, legislation or taxation. A meeting of the estates that covered an entire kingdom was called an estates general.

Overview
The first estate was the clergy, the second the nobility and the third the commoners, although actual membership in the third estate varied from country to country. Bourgeoisie, peasants and people with no estate from birth were separated in Sweden and Finland as late as 1905.

Representation through estates was the norm in Europe until the advent of popular representation beginning with the French Revolution. The Estates General of France were convoked only twice between 1614 and 1789, both times during the Fronde (1648–53), and in neither case did they actually meet. At the final meeting of the Estates in 1789, they voted to join in a single National Assembly, generally seen as marking the start of the French Revolution. Estates continued to meet in Navarre until 1828, in Hungary until 1848, in Sweden until 1866, and in the Duchy of Mecklenburg until 1918.

In some countries, the parliament kept the same name when its feudal organization was replaced with a more modern kind of representation, like census or universal suffrage. In Sweden, the Riksdag of the Estates was replaced with the Riksdag in 1866.

List of estates
Convention of the Estates of Scotland
Convention of Estates (1689)
Council of States (Switzerland)
Estates of the Netherlands Antilles
Estates of Aruba
Estates of Curaçao
Estates of Sint Maarten
Estates General (France)
Estates of Navarre
Landstände, the territorial estates within the Holy Roman Empire
Estates of Württemberg
Parliament of Scotland, a meeting of the three estates of the realm
Riksdag of the Estates, the former diet of Sweden
Stamenti, the former parliament of Sardinia
States of Alderney
States of Guernsey
States of Election
States of Jersey
States General of the Batavian Republic
States General of the Netherlands
States Provincial (France)
Estates of Béarn
Estates of Brittany
Estates of Burgundy
Estates of Languedoc
States Provincial (Netherlands)
States of Brabant
States of Drenthe
States of Flanders
States of Flevoland
States of Friesland
States of Gelderland
States of Groningen
States of Holland and West Friesland
States of Limburg
States of North Brabant
States of North Holland
States of Overijssel
States of South Holland
States of Utrecht
States of Zeeland
Zemstvo

References

Legislatures